Telugu Association of North America (also referred to as TANA) is a non-profit organization and is one of oldest Indo-American national level organisation primarily for networking of Telugu people in North America. Anjaiah Chowdary Lavu is the President of TANA and Niranjan Srungavarapu is the Executive-Vice President for the 2021-2023 term. Dr. Hanumaiah Bandla is the Chairperson of the Board of Directors. Venkata Ramana Yarlagadda is the Chairman of TANA Foundation.

External links 
 TANA News on Telugu Community News portal
 TANA Help line for Telugu People
 TANA Help line for Women

References 

Telugu society
Telugu American
Non-profit organizations based in the United States
Telugu organizations in North America
1977 establishments in New York (state)
International Telugu Associations